Hope A. Weiler, a Canadian Nutrionist is Associate Professor in the School of Dietetics and Human Nutrition of McGill University's Faculty of Agricultural and Environmental Sciences.

She holds  a B.A.Sc. in Applied Human Nutrition, from  University of Guelph; and a Ph.D. in Medical Sciences, Cell Biology and Metabolism, from McMaster University. As of 2018, she is a Canada Research Chair Tier 1  in Nutrition and Health Across the Lifespan at McGill University. Her research speciality is the prevention of osteoporosis.

She has also done research on childhood obesity. Based on results from a 2012 study, she suggested that activities to build a child's muscle mass are more important than diets targeted toward weight loss. She has also studied the effect of dietary supplements such as Vitamin D to enhance muscle growth in infants and toddlers.

References 

Academic staff of McGill University
Canadian nutritionists
McMaster University alumni
University of Guelph alumni
Living people
Year of birth missing (living people)
Place of birth missing (living people)